Kutlovo may refer to either of the following Serbian villages:

 Kutlovo (Kuršumlija)
 Kutlovo (Stanovo)